The following is a list of episodes for the Australian television drama programme, Spirited.

From 2010 to 2011, 18 episodes of Spirited aired.

Series overview

Episodes

Series 1 (2010)

Series 2 (2011)

References

Lists of Australian drama television series episodes